Ayutthaya United Football Club is a Thai professional football club based in Sena, Phra Nakhon Si Ayutthaya province. The club competes in Thai League 2, the second tier of Thai football league system. The team plays their home matches at Ayutthaya Province Stadium.

Prior to 2016 the club was called "Sena Municipality Football Club". After it was promoted from runner-up Khǒr Royal Cup to Regional League Division 2, the club changed its name to Ayutthaya United.

History

Sena Municipality 

Sena Municipality football club was established in 2007. They are the local football team of Sena district, Ayutthaya and they played in amateur football in Thailand called "Royal football cup".

Khor Royal Cup 

In 2008, Sena Municipality football club took part in Khor Royal Cup. In 2007/08 season, Sena Municipality were in round of 16 before losing to Assumption Sriracha School football club 2–3. In 2008/09, they again reached the round of 16 before losing to Hua-Hin Municipality F.C. 0–1.

In Khor royal cup 2013, Sena Municipality reached the semi-final. They have a match with Nakhon Ratchasima Municipality Sport School Football Club. Sena Municipality defeated to them 4–2 but still earned a promotion to Khǒr Royal Cup.

Khǒr Royal Cup

In 2014s, Sena Municipality football club played in Khǒr Royal Cup for the first time and they reached the round of 16. They were defeated by Institute of Physical Education Bangkok F.C.  1–2.
In 2015s, Sena Municipality advanced to the semi-final, with promotion to the Thailand Regional League Division for the winner.
In semi-final, despite being defeated by Institute of Physical Education Samut Sakhon F.C., they still gained promotion because of problems in the other semi-final between Air Technical Training School and Pak Chong School Alumni Association F.C. Sena Municipality subsequently got promoted.

Ayutthaya United 

After Sena Municipality got promote to Regional league division. They requested patent to be corporation called "Ayutthaya United (2015) Company limited" and change club name to Ayutthaya United. The team plays their home matches at Senabodee Stadium, Sena district.

On 19 March 2016, Ayutthaya United played their first football league match at Nakhon Sawan Province Stadium with Nakhon Sawan F.C. Ayutthaya United won 1–0 by the goal of Rungroj Sawangsri, former Thailand national defender. So, he was the first player who score a goal for Ayutthaya United in professional level.

On 7 December 2016, Ayutthaya Warrior were collapsed to combine with Ayutthaya United.

Club logo
 Club logo since 2016 season

Stadium and locations

Season by season record

Current squad

 (Captain)

Club staff

Team records

Matches 
 First Official Match 
 1–1 draw v Visuttharangsi Alumni Association, February 2008: Khor Royal Cup 2007–2008
 First Football League Match 
 0–1 win v Nakhon Sawan F.C., 19 March 2016. ( Nakhon Sawan Province Stadium )
 First Thai FA Cup Match 
 0–4 loss v PTT Rayong F.C., 18 May 2016. ( PTT Stadium , Rayong)
 First Thai League Cup Match 
 2–1 win v Saraburi TRU F.C., 23 March 2016. ( Senabordee Stadium, Ayutthaya )

Scorelines
 Biggest Win
 9–0 v Pumin Witthaya School, 9 January 2009 in Khor Royal Cup 2008–2009 ,BG Stadium
 Biggest Loss
 0–6 v Police Tero F.C. (23 February 2019 in Thai League 2)
 League Biggest Win (Home) 
 4–0 v Ayutthaya F.C. (1 April 2018 in Thai League 3)
 4–0 v Muangkan United F.C. (5 August 2018 in Thai League 3)
 4–0 v Navy F.C. (13 October 2021 in Thai League 2)
 League Biggest Win (Away) 
 1–5 v Singburi Bangrajan F.C. (25 February 2017 in Thai League 3)
 0–4 v Ubon Ratchathani F.C. (17 March 2017 in Thai League 3)

Player records
 Most goals in all competitions
 21, by Nascimento dos Santos Neto Osvaldo (league 20 goals, league cup 1 goals, F.A. cup 0 goals)
 Most League goals
 20, by Nascimento dos Santos Neto Osvaldo 
 20, by Yoo Byung-soo
 Most League goals in a season
 20, by Yoo Byung-soo (during 2020–21 Thai League 2)
 First player to score a league goal
 Rungroj Sawangsri, on 19 March 2016 in a 1–0 away victory at Nakhon Sawan Province Stadium in 2016 Regional League Division 2
 First foreign player to score a league goal
 Lee Tae Sung ( South Korea ), on 28 May 2016 in 1–2 away victory at Chaiyaphum Province Stadium ( v Mashare Chaiyaphum F.C. )
 Most appearances in all competitions
 Sittichai Trisilp – 77
 Oldest first-team player
 Cho Sung-hwan – 38 years, 356 days (31 March 2021 vs. Rajnavy, 2020–21 Thai League 2)
 Youngest first-team player
 Pakapol Boonchuay – 17 years, 191 days (27 February 2021 vs. Thai Union Sumut Sakhon, 2020–21 Thai League 2)
 Oldest player to score a league goal
 Datsakorn Thonglao – 37 years, 91 days (31 March 2021 vs. Rajnavy, 2020–21 Thai League 2)
 Youngest player to score a league goal
 Jirawat Thongsaengphrao – 18 years, 331 days (25 February 2017 vs. Singburi Bangrajun F.C., 2017 Thai League 2)

References

External links
 Official Facebookpage of Ayutthaya United

 
Association football clubs established in 2007
Football clubs in Thailand
Phra Nakhon Si Ayutthaya province
2007 establishments in Thailand